The National Technology Transfer and Advancement Act (NTTAA; United States Public Law 104-113) was signed into law March 7, 1996.  The Act amended several existing acts and mandated new directions for federal agencies with the purpose of:

 bringing technology and industrial innovation to market more quickly
 encouraging cooperative research and development between business and the federal government by providing access to federal laboratories
 making it easier for businesses to obtain exclusive licenses to technology and inventions that result from cooperative research with the federal government

The Act made a direct impact on the development of new industrial and technology standards by requiring that all Federal agencies use cooperatively developed standards, particularly those developed by standards developing organizations.

External links 
National Institute of Standards and Technology NTTAA Home Page

Politics of the United States
Acts of the 104th United States Congress
1996 in the United States
Science and technology in the United States